The 72nd Separate Mechanized Brigade named after the Black Zaporozhians is a formation of the Ukrainian Ground Forces. It was previously named the 29th Rifle Division (2nd formation) and then the 72nd Guards Rifle Division of the Soviet Ground Forces. In 1957, it became a motor rifle division.

Since 2014, the brigade has participated in the Ukrainian-Russian war in Donbas as part of the Anti-Terrorist Operation. In the summer of 2014, units of the brigade fought hard on the Russian-Ukrainian border, in the Azov region, and, in the winter of 2016, near Avdiivka in the industrial zone.

In August 2017, the brigade received an honorary title after the military formation of the Ukrainian People's Republic, the Black Zaporozhian Cavalry Regiment.

The brigade is extensively involved in the Russian invasion of Ukraine participating in battles in the Kyiv Oblast and in the Donbas.

History

World War II
The 29th Rifle Division (2nd formation) was redesignated the 72nd Guards Rifle Division by Directorate of the General Staff order No.104 on 1 March 1943. The units of the division were renumbered as follows:

On March 3, 1943, 72nd Guards Rifle Division was involved in battles for liberation of Belgorod. Soon they were near Kharkiv and Krasnohrad. On 19 September, the division was awarded the title Krasnohrad. On 8 January 1944, the division was awarded the Order of the Red Banner.

The division fought in the Budapest Offensive from late October 1944. On 15 December, units of the division reinforced Cavalry Mechanized Group Pliev during the attack on Szécsény. On 9 January, the division was attached to the 24th Guards Rifle Corps. The division captured the area around Bart. The division's attack was stopped by the 1st Battalion of Grenadier Regiment 317 a kilometer north of the village.

Cold War 
In May 1946, the division became the 7th Guards Rifle Brigade, part of the 33rd Guards Rifle Corps. In October 1953, it became a division again. The 72nd Guards Rifle Division became a motor rifle division stationed in the Kyiv Military District at Bila Tserkva on 4 June 1957. It was part of the 1st Guards Army (Soviet Union). On 19 February 1962, the 280th Separate Equipment Maintenance and Recovery Battalion was activated. A missile battalions was also activated on the same day. In 1968, the 220th Separate Guards Sapper Battalion became an Engineer Sapper Battalion. In 1972, the 191st Separate Chemical Defence Company became the 23rd Separate Chemical Defence Battalion. The 1345th Separate Anti-Tank Artillery Battalion was activated on 15 November 1972. The motor transport battalion became the 892nd Separate Material Supply Battalion in 1980. In 1990, the division was equipped with 133 T-64 main battle tanks. During the Cold War, the division was maintained at 25% strength, with one full strength regiment.

Ukraine
After the fall of the Soviet Union it was transferred to Ukraine.
In 1992, Colonel Volodymyr Lytvyntsev  –  Commander 72nd Guards Motor Rifle Division of the Kyiv Military District was given the rank of Major General.

On August 23, 1995, Colonel Nikolai Nikolaevich Tsytsyursky, Commander 72nd Mechanized Infantry Division of the 1st Army Corps of the Odessa Military District, was given the rank of Major-General. In accordance with a decree of August 23, 1998, division commander Colonel Grigoriy Pedchenko  was promoted to major-general. On June 29, 1999, the 72nd Guards Mechanized Division of the Operational Command North of the Armed Forces of Ukraine was given the honorary title of "Kyiv".

It was reduced in size to a mechanized brigade in 2002.

In May 2014 72nd Guards Mechanized Brigade was involved in the Mariupol standoff during the 2014 pro-Russian conflict in Ukraine. During this conflict Ukrainian singers Zlata Ognevich and Anastasia Prikhodko raised money for the Brigade. The brigade defended Sector D near Chernopartyzhansk, Sverdlovsk and Diakove alongside the 51st Mechanized Brigade from July 2014. Separatist and Russian attacks resulted in the brigade being surrounded and cut off from supply by early August. The brigade's 1st Battalion and elements of the 51st Brigade, along with a group of border guards (about 400 total), destroyed their weapons and crossed into Russia. They were interned and returned to Ukrainian territory. Major Mykhailo Drapatyi's 2nd Battalion of the brigade near Chernopartyzhansk broke out of the encirclement, covered by the 30th Mechanized and 95th Airmobile Brigades from the south. Two soldiers from the 2nd Battalion were killed in the breakout. The convoy in which 195 soldiers of the brigade returned to Ukrainian territory after crossing into Russia on 4 August 2014 was fired on by separatists.

On 18 November 2015 the brigade's honorific "Red Banner" was removed as part of an Armed Forces-wide removal of Soviet awards and honorifics. On 22 August 2016, its Guards title was removed. Its honorifics "Krasnohrad–Kyiv" were removed and replaced with the honorific Black Zaporozhian in honor of the Ukrainian People's Army Black Zaporizhian Cavalry Regiment on 23 August 2017.

Russian Invasion of Ukraine 

On the morning of 24 February 2022, the Russian Armed Forces launched its special military operation into Ukraine. The 72nd Mechanized Brigade was one of few maneuver formations defending Ukraine's capital, Kyiv, to include a number of special operations, national guard, and hastily formed Territorial Defense Forces which all told, formed an estimated 20,000 infantry force. The Russian 35th, 36th, and 41st Combined Arms armies barreled down roads from Belarus and southern Russian towards Kyiv. The brigade met their formations armed with western supplied weaponry such as FGM-148 Javelin and NLAW destroying tanks from as far as a mile away. The brigade's primary role, however, was reconnaissance of the Russian formations and to provide targeting data to the two artillery brigades including the 44th Artillery for strikes. Ukraine's artillery was used to great effect and reduced cohesion among Russian battalions.

Ukraine's top general, Valerii Zaluzhnyi, recognized the danger Russia's airhead at Hostomel posed to Ukraine's capital and ordered the brigade to organize a counterattack. With the 4th Rapid Reaction Brigade, and support from the Ukrainian Air Force, launched their attack on the Russian forces who lacked armour support but had close air support in the form of at least two Su-25's. As the operation progressed, more Ukrainian units from the Georgian Legion and Air Assault Forces joined the fight, denying Russia the ability to fly in troops via Il-76. Ukrainian units surrounded the airport by the evening and forced the remaining Russian troops into nearby forests. Later, the 4th Rapid Reaction Brigade posted on their Facebook an image of Ukrainian soldiers celebrating while holding a bullet-riddled flag inside Hostomel Airport.

The brigade continued to apply pressure to Russian vanguard formations destroying a number of tanks and IFV's fixing the beleaguered units in place while serving as forward observers for continued artillery strikes. The majority of losses came when the Russian units were concentrated by artillery fire, stalling their advance for several days and leading to the infamous 40-mile convoy north of Kyiv.

Now stalled, Ukrainian units across the front counterattacked, squeezing the Russian units into narrow corridors to make their situation untenable. In Brovary, the brigade ambushed a Russian armoured column from the 90th Guards Tank Division hitting the first and last vehicle while trapping the middle vehicles. The Ukrainians were unable to cut off the Russian's route of escape causing many of their forces to flee into nearby forests. Despite their retreat, heavy fighting continued in the surrounding area for several days. Russian forces were reported to have shot civilians suspected in aiding the Ukrainian forces  during the fighting. On 29 March, the Russian Ministry of Defence ordered its forces in the region to retreat and were later redeployed for the fighting in the east.  On 1 April, the city's mayor claimed Ukrainian forces pushed the Russian forces out of Brovary.

Throughout summer, the brigade participated in the Donbas offensive, namely the Bakhmut area fighting in the Battle of Bakhmut. Heavy fighting in the area resulted in substantial casualties to the brigade's professional soldiers causing many of their positions to be replaced by conscripts. The brigade's reconnaissance company was reduced from 128 men to 82 due to casualties.

Sometime in August, the brigade was redeployed to Pavlivka. The brigade assessed that 600 Russian troops and 30 armored vehicles entered their area of operation culminating in a battle in late October. On November 3, the Russian 155th Naval Infantry Brigade committed its forces to the battle. The brigade's commander released a video intended for the governor of the Primorsky Oblast, the unit's home, asking for help as the brigade suffered 300 casualties. Losses were heavy on both sides and the brigade eventually withdrew.

By January 2023, the brigade fortified Vuhledar following Pavlivka's fall against a renewed assault from the 155th Guards Naval Infantry. The Russian advance was initially successful, breaking through frontal lines, however, ultimately failed as casualties mounted due to frontal assaults, lack of ammunition for their organic fire support, the use of their T-80 tanks in an indirect fire role, and lack of staffing to properly organise an offensive. Members of the 72nd Mechanized Brigade destroyed Naval Infantry tanks and a BMP-3 infantry fighting vehicle with their Javelin anti-tank missiles.

Awards
 March 1, 1943, received the honorable designation "Guards"
 January 1944 received Order of the Red Banner award for clearing the city of Kirovohrad
 September 20, 1943, received the honorable name "Krasnohradska"
 August 23, 2017, received the honorary title "Chornykh Zaporozhtsiv"

Famous people of the division
 Lieutenant Volodymyr Mykheiev – First person in the division to receive Hero of Soviet Union award
 Oles' Honchar, Oleksandr – Ukrainian writer

Divisional order of battle

1988–1991
Late Soviet Period Structure
222nd Guards Motor Rifle Regiment – Bila Tserkva
224th Guards Motor Rifle Regiment – Bila Tserkva
229th Guards Motor Rifle Regiment – Bila Tserkva
292nd Guards Tank Regiment – Honcharivske
155th Guards Artillery Regiment – Smila
1129th Anti-Aircraft Artillery Regiment – Bila Tserkva
1345th Anti-Tank Artillery Battalion – Bila Tserkva
117th Separate Reconnaissance Battalion – Bila Tserkva
538th Separate Communications Battalion – Bila Tserkva
23rd Separate Chemical Defence Battalion – Bila Tserkva
220th Separate Engineer Battalion – Bila Tserkva
280th Separate Maintenance Battalion
892nd Combat Service Support Battalion

1992–2002
  Command and Staff of the 72nd Mechanized Infantry Division
  224th Separate Mechanized Infantry Regiment
  229th Separate Mechanized Infantry Regiment
  Separate Tank Battalion
  155th Separate Self-Repelled Artillery Regiment
  1129th Separate Anti-Aircraft Missile Regiment
  1345th Separate Anti-Tank Artillery Battalion
  220th Separate Engineer Battalion
  538th Separate Signal Battalion
  117th Separate Reconnaissance Battalion
  23rd Separate Chemical Battalion
  892nd Separate Logistics Battalion
  280th Separate Repair and Recovery Battalion
  149th Separate Medical Battalion

Current structure
As of 2017 the brigade's structure is as follows:

 72nd Mechanized Brigade, Bila Tserkva
 Headquarters & Headquarters Company
 1st Mechanized Battalion
 2nd Mechanized Battalion
 3rd Mechanized Battalion
 Tank Battalion
 12th Motorized Infantry Battalion "Kyiv"
 Brigade Artillery Regiment
 Headquarters & Target Acquisition Battery
 Self-propelled Artillery Battalion (2S3 Akatsiya)
 Self-propelled Artillery Battalion (2S1 Gvozdika)
 Rocket Artillery Battalion (BM-21 Grad)
 Anti-tank Artillery Battalion (MT-12 Rapira)
 Anti-Aircraft Missile Artillery Battalion
 Engineer Battalion
 Maintenance Battalion
 Logistic Battalion
 Reconnaissance Company
 Sniper Company
 Electronic Warfare Company
 Signal Company
 Radar Company
 CBRN-defense Company
 Medical Company
 Brigade Band

Traditions 
Own symbolism appeared in the division in the second half of the 1990s. In the fall of 1996, the head of the group of socio-psychological department of the 229th Mechanized Regiment of the 72nd Mechanized Division Major V. Pektny developed a system of shrug management and parts of this connection. The emblems of the parts were a single -shaped shield and sizes, divided by horizontal into two halves. In the upper half of the shield, the symbolism of the division was contained: a bow with three arrows from the city coat of arms of the White Church against the background of the molding wall and the rising sun. The lower half of the shield was intended for the symbolism of a particular regiment or a separate battalion.

The brigade has a march: "Brave guys, a brave army!".

Until 2017, she had the honorary name of Krasnograd-Kyiv.

On August 23, 2017, in order to restore the historical traditions of the National Army on the names of military units, given the exemplary completion of the tasks, high rates in combat training and on the occasion of the 26th anniversary. On August 24, 2017, at the Independence Day parade of Ukraine, President of Ukraine Petro Poroshenko presented the brigade to the brigade.

On March 7, 2019, the Head of the General Staff of the Armed Forces Viktor Muzhenko approved the new symbolism of the brigade. The sketch mark consists of two elements: a wicked emblem and the motto. The emblem contains a British heraldic shield of red, the color of the shield symbolizes belonging to the point of permanent dislocation - the White Church, the color of which is also red. At the heart of the shield is an image of a black triangle, which combines the corners of the shield, which symbolizes the black headdress - the snack of the fighter of the equestrian regiment of the Black Cossacks. In the center of the shield is the image of the Adam's head, which is located on the back of the banners of the Black Cossacks. The deviation tape is a curved ribbon with the motto of the horse regiment of the Black Cossacks "Ukraine or Death" in the middle.

In December 2019, the brigade received a personal honorary flag (Korogwa) based on the historical symbolism of the Horse Regiment of Black Cossacks.

On May 6, 2022, the brigade was awarded the honorary award "For Courage and Bravery".

Commanders 
 Major General Anatoly Losev (1 March 1943 – 24 March 1945)
 Lieutenant Colonel Grigory Balatov (25 March  25 April 1945)
 Colonel Alexander Pankov (26 April  11 May 1945)
 Major General Pyotr Berestov (July 1945 – January 1947)
 Major General Sergiy Bezlishchenko
 Colonel Andriy Hryshchenko ( June 2015)
 Colonel Andriy Sokolov (June 2015  present)

Notes

References

External links
 72nd Mechanized Brigade

Mechanised infantry brigades of Ukraine
Military units and formations established in 1941
Military units and formations established in 2002
2002 establishments in Ukraine
Military units and formations of the 2022 Russian invasion of Ukraine
Military units and formations awarded the Order of the Red Banner
Military units and formations of Ukraine in the war in Donbas
Military units and formations of the Russo-Ukrainian War